Palau de Noguera is a locality located in the municipality of Tremp, in Province of Lleida province, Catalonia, Spain. As of 2020, it has a population of 62.

Geography 
Palau de Noguera is located 89km north-northeast of Lleida.

References

Populated places in the Province of Lleida